The Czechoslovakia national women's volleyball team was the national volleyball team for Czechoslovakia that had represented the country in international competitions and friendly matches between 1948 and 1993

FIVB considers Czech Republic as the inheritor of the records of Czechoslovakia (1948–1993).

Results

Olympic Games
  1968 — 6th place
  1972 — 7th place

World Championship
  1952 –  Third place 
  1956 – 4th place
  1960 –  Third place
  1962 – 6th place
  1970 – 5th place
  1974 – 17th place
  1978 – 12th place
  1982 – didn't qualify
  1986 – 11th place
  1990 – didn't qualify

European Championship

  1949 –  Silver medal
  1950 –  Bronze medal
  1951 – didn't qualify
  1955 –  Gold medal
  1958 –  Silver medal
  1963 – 6th place
  1967 –  Bronze medal
  1971 –  Silver medal
  1975 – 5th place
  1977 – 5th place
  1979 – 7th place
  1981 – 6th place
  1983 – 8th place
  1985 – 4th place
  1987 –  Bronze medal
  1989 – 5th place
  1991 – 5th place

Team

1986 Last World Championship squad

Coach: Vladimír Hančík

See also

Czechoslovakia men's national volleyball team

References

External links
Official website
FIVB profile

National women's volleyball teams
Volleyball in Czechoslovakia
Volleyball